Arek Olczak (born 2 August 1963) is an Australian wrestler. He competed in the men's Greco-Roman 85 kg at the 2000 Summer Olympics.

References

1963 births
Living people
Australian male sport wrestlers
Olympic wrestlers of Australia
Wrestlers at the 2000 Summer Olympics
Sportspeople from Warsaw